A promenade is a long, open, level area, usually next to a river or large body of water, where people may walk.

Promenade may refer to:

Dance
 Promenade (dance move), a basic dance move in a number of dances
 Prom, or promenade dance, a formal/semi-formal dance party of high school students
 Western promenade dance, a form of partner dance
 Promenade position, a dance position in ballroom and other dances

Music

Classical music and performances
 Promenade concert, concerts originally in the pleasure gardens of 18th/19th century London
 The Proms, an annual series of daily classical music concerts in the Royal Albert Hall
 Promenade (musical), a 1965 musical by María Irene Fornés and Rev. Al Carmines
Promenade I, by Stephen Dodgson
 "Promenade", a recurring movement in Pictures at an Exhibition by Mussorgsky
 "Promenade", by George Gershwin, originally titled "Walking the Dog (Gershwin)" as a musical number for Shall We Dance (1937)

Albums and songs
 Promenade (The Divine Comedy album), 1994
 Promenade (Kevin Burke and Mícheál Ó Domhnaill album), 1979
 Promenade (Street Sweeper Social Club song), 2010
 "Promenade", a song by Everclear from the 2012 album Invisible Stars
 "Promenade", a song by U2 from the 1984 album The Unforgettable Fire
 "Promenade", a song by Underground Lovers from the 1992 album Leaves Me Blind
 "Promenade", a 1976 song by Herb Alpert
 "Promenade", a 1945 song by Leroy Anderson

Other uses
 Promenade deck, a deck found on several types of passenger ships and riverboats
 Promenade MRT station, in Singapore
 Promenade (shopping centre), in Thornhill, Ontario, Canada
 La Promenade (Renoir), an 1870 painting

See also
 
 Prom (disambiguation)
 Promenade Mall (disambiguation)
 Promenade des Anglais, in Nice, France